The George M. Low Award is an annual award given by NASA to its subcontractors in recognition of quality and performance. NASA characterizes it as a "premier award". NASA's chief of safety and mission assurance, Terrence Wilcutt, called it "our recognition for their management's leadership and employee commitment to the highest standards in performance."

The award was named after George M. Low, a NASA leader and former administrator who spearheaded efforts to improve quality and mitigate risk after the disastrous Apollo 1 fire. He provided management and direction for the Mercury, Gemini, Apollo, and advanced crewed missions programs.

Recipients 
 2012 - URS Federal Services; ATA Engineering, Inc.
 2011 - Sierra Lobo, Inc.; Teledyne Brown Engineering
 2010 - Analytical Mechanics Associates, Inc.; Neptec Design Group; Jacobs Technology, Inc.; ATK Aerospace Systems
 2009 - United Space Alliance; Applied Geo Technologies
 2008 - ARES Corporation; Oceaneering International
 2007 - ASRC Aerospace Corporation; Pratt & Whitney Rocketdyne; Sierra Lobo; Lockheed Martin
 2006 - Teledyne Brown Engineering; Barrios Technologies
 2005 - SGT Inc; ATK Thiokol; QSS Group, Inc.; BTAS, Inc
 2004 - BTAS, Inc. (Business Technologies and Solutions), ERC, Inc; Northrop Grumman; SGS; Alliance Spacesystems, Inc.; Titan Corporation
 2003 - Marotta Controls; Lockheed Martin; Boeing
 2002 - Analytical Services & Materials; Jacobs Sverdrup; ManTech; RS Information Systems; Williams International
 2001 - Native American Services; Raytheon; Swales Aerospace
 2000 - Advanced Technology; Boeing; Computer Sciences Corporation; Jackson and Tull
 1999 - Barrios Technology; Kay and Associates; Raytheon; Thiokol Corporation
 1997-1998 - Advanced Technology, AlliedSignal, BST Systems, DynCorp, ILC Dover
 1996-1997 - Dynamic Engineering, Inc.; Hummer Associates; Boeing North American; Scientific and Commercial Systems Corporation; Hamilton Standard Space Systems International; Unisys Corporation
 1995-1996 - Hamilton Standard Space Systems International
 1994-1995 - Unisys Corporation
 1992 - IBM; Honeywell
 1991 - Thiokol Corporation; Grumman Corporation
 1990 - Rockwell International Corporation; Marotta Scientific Controls
 1989 - Lockheed Corporation
 1988 - Rockwell International Corporation
 1987 - IBM; Martin Marietta Corporation

See also
 List of engineering awards
 List of awards named after people

References

External links
  George M. Low Award

Aerospace engineering awards
American science and technology awards
Awards and decorations of NASA